Orbit is a brand of sugarless chewing gum from the Wrigley Company.  In the United States, where it was re-launched in 2001, it is sold in cardboard boxes with 14 individually wrapped pieces per package. In the UK, where it was launched in 1899 it was originally sold as a traditional long-stick gum, later replaced by the same format as the US.

Orbit White, packaged in blister packs of 20 pieces, was released  to compete with Cadbury Adams' Trident White gum in 2001.

History 
Orbit was originally released in 1899. It was launched in 1944 in the United States as a replacement brand by Wrigley due to rationing of gum-making ingredients in World War II.  The brand was discontinued after the war ended, when Wrigley's three established gum brands, Juicy Fruit, Wrigley's Spearmint and Doublemint, returned to the US market.

The gum was reintroduced 30 years later in 1976, when it was introduced in Germany, Switzerland and The Netherlands. This marked the first time that a sugar-free gum was marketed under the Wrigley name.  The brand was later introduced in other countries, including Canada, Australia, the UK, Norway, Poland, Israel and Serbia.

The gum returned to American shelves in the late 1970s, but was removed from the shelves in the 1980s due to a suspicion that the sweetener might cause cancer. The gum was relaunched in the US in 2001.

Orbit gum is now sold in the UK as Wrigleys Extra, alongside the 'real', hard shell Extra gum.

Advertising 
The US advertising campaign for Orbit centered on the Orbit Girl, a British accented character who always showed up to "dirty" and awkward situations wearing all white, a scarf, and a smile.  Vanessa Branch played the Orbit Girl from 2001 to 2010, when she was replaced by Farris Patton, who played the Orbit Girl from 2010 through 2014.

In 2014, Orbit moved to a more global approach to marketing, replacing the Orbit Girl, and with a new commercial with Sarah Silverman to kick off its new campaign: "Eat. Drink. Chew Orbit." to emphasize the benefits of chewing gum after eating and drinking.

In the UK, Ireland, Australia, New Zealand, South Africa and Canada, the Orbit name was replaced by Extra in 2015, with the same 14-piece package. In 2019 the replacement was applied in Germany as well.

Products

Orbit 

 Peppermint
 Spearmint
 Eucalyptus
 Mint
 Bubblemint
 Wintermint
 Winterfresh 

 Sweetmint

 Freeze Mint
 Citrusmint
 Apple Remix
 Tropical Remix
 Strawberry Remix
 Wildberry Remix
 Peppermint DoublePak
 Spearmint DoublePak
 Citrus Remix
 Melon Remix
 Crystal Mint
 Lemon Lime
 Mint Mojito
 Maui Melon Mint
 Positively Pomegranate
 Raspberry Mint
 Fabulous Fruitini
 Sangria Fresca (discontinued)
 Strawberry Mint
 Lime Melon
 Piña Colada
 Orange Cardamom
 Mixed Fruit
 Coca Cola
 Blueberry
 Raspberry Pomegranate

Orbit White

Orbit White was launched in 2002 as a sugar-free pellet gum and sub brand of Orbit gum.  Packaged in blister packs of 12 pieces, it was released to compete with Cadbury Adams' Trident White gum in 2001.
 Bubblemint
 Mint
 Peppermint
 Spearmint
 Wintermint

Orbit for Kids

 Bubblegum
 Strawberry and Banana
 Grapes (hard/impossible to find in stores, only able to be bought reliably on the internet)

Excel Mist in Canada had "micro-bursts" which are small polka dot chips filled with a flavor contrast to the rest of the stick. The "micro-bursts" were meant to create "a hydrating sensation", as claimed on the box.  Orbit discontinued the Orbit Mist subline in 2013.
 Peppermint Spray
 Watermelon Spring
 Mango Surf

References 

Chewing gum
Wrigley Company brands
Products introduced in 1944